The Mirama–Kabale High Voltage Power Line is a high voltage electricity power line, connecting the high voltage substation in the town of Mirama Hills, in the  Western Region to another high voltage substation in te city of Kabale, also in the Western Region of Uganda.

Location
The 132 kilo Volt power line starts at the Uganda Electricity Transmission Company Limited (UETCL) 132kV substation at Mirama Hills, in Ntungamo District, at the international border with Rwanda.

Overview
The power line was developed as part of plans to improve grid power delivery and reliability to the districts in the Kigezi sub-region and to deliver high voltage electricity to Kabale, the largest city in Kigezi. The other consideration is to evacuate power generated by Kikagati Hydroelectric Power Station (16 megawatts) and Nshungyezi Hydroelectric Power Station (39 megawatts) and transmit it to Kabale for industrial, commercial and domestic use. A loan obtained from the Islamic Development Bank (IsDB), was used in funding the construction of this power line, including a 132/33kV substations at Mirama Hills, and Kabale. In addition, funded by that same loan, is the construction of  medium voltage (33kV and 11kV) distribution lines and  low voltage (415V and 214V) lines. Also, a total of 377 transformers (25kVA, 50kVA, 100kVA & 200kVA) will be installed, together with 14,185 last-mile customer connections.

Construction and funding
Work on this power transmission line began in 2014. In 2015, the Islamic Development Bank agreed to lend the government of Uganda US$83,750,000 to build this power line and Opuyo–Moroto High Voltage Power Line. As of June 2019, procurement of a contractor for the 
Mirama–Kabale Transmission Line was ongoing.

See also
Energy in Uganda
List of power stations in Uganda

References

External links
Website of the Uganda Electricity Transmission Company Limited
Delays cited in power line construction projects As of 26 October 2015.
Museveni attributes persistent power outages to use of old electric poles, wires As of 7 June 2019. 

High-voltage transmission lines in Uganda
Energy infrastructure in Africa
Energy in Uganda